Linnea Berthelsen (born 13 July 1993) is a Danish actress of Indian descent, who is best known for her recurring role as Kali, also known as Eight, the sister of Eleven in the second season of the science-fiction horror Netflix original series Stranger Things.

Personal life
Berthelsen was born in India, and brought up in Kalundborg. She moved to England in 2014 to study at East 15 Acting School in Essex, and now lives in London.

Career
Berthelsen started acting in her late teens. She made her acting debut in the short film Mirrors in 2014. She later continued to appear in short films such as Natskygge, Dyspno and Cape Fear. In 2015, she appeared in the Danish film Hybrid. In 2017, she was cast as Kali / Eight with the ability to create hallucinations, in the Netflix original science fiction horror series Stranger Things.

Filmography

Film

Television

References

External links

1993 births
Living people
Actresses from Copenhagen
Danish film actresses
Danish television actresses
Alumni of East 15 Acting School
Indian emigrants to Denmark
Danish people of Indian descent
Actresses of Indian descent
Danish expatriates in England
21st-century Danish actresses